Ponta do Tristão is the northernmost point of the island of Madeira. It is located in Porto Moniz parish, to the northwest of the settlement of Santa Maria Madalena.

Geography of Madeira
Madeira Island